Karnup is an outer southern suburb of Perth, the capital city of Western Australia, located within the City of Rockingham. It is named after the Karnup townsite, which was declared in 1924 and which, in turn, took its name from an Indigenous name of unknown meaning.

References

Suburbs of Perth, Western Australia
Suburbs in the City of Rockingham